Polygonum cascadense is a species of flowering plant in the buckwheat family known by the common name Cascade knotweed. It has been found only in the State of Oregon in the northwestern United States, in the Cascades and in the Blue Mountains.

Description
It produces small groups of white flowers with red anthers.

References

External links
Paul Slichter, The Knotweeds and Smartweeds of the Columbia River Gorge of Oregon and Washington, Cascades Polygonum, Polygonum cascadense photos
Oregon Flora Image Project, University of Hawai'i photos

cascadense
Endemic flora of the United States
Flora of Oregon
Flora of the Cascade Range
Plants described in 1949
Flora without expected TNC conservation status